TeST TST-14 may refer to:

TeST TST-14 Bonus, piston-powered motor glider
TeST TST-14J BonusJet, jet-powered motorglider